The Canton of Doullens  is a canton situated in the department of the Somme and in the Hauts-de-France region of northern France.

Geography 
The canton is organised around the commune of Doullens.

Composition
As part of the French canton reorganisation that came into effect in March 2015, the canton was expanded from 14 to 44 communes:

Agenville
Autheux
Authieule
Barly
Béalcourt
Beaumetz
Beauquesne
Beauval
Bernâtre
Bernaville
Berneuil
Boisbergues
Bonneville
Bouquemaison
Brévillers
Candas
Conteville
Domesmont
Domléger-Longvillers
Doullens
Épécamps
Fieffes-Montrelet
Fienvillers
Frohen-sur-Authie
Gézaincourt
Gorges
Grouches-Luchuel
Hem-Hardinval
Heuzecourt
Hiermont
Humbercourt
Longuevillette
Lucheux
Maizicourt
Le Meillard
Mézerolles
Montigny-les-Jongleurs
Neuvillette
Occoches
Outrebois
Prouville
Remaisnil
Saint-Acheul
Terramesnil

Population

See also
 Arrondissements of the Somme department
 Cantons of the Somme department
 Communes of the Somme department

References

Doullens